"Aston Martin Music" is the third single from rapper Rick Ross's fourth studio album Teflon Don. The song was released as a single on October 5, 2010. The song, which was produced by J.U.S.T.I.C.E. League, it features vocals from Canadian recording artist Drake and R&B singer Chrisette Michele.

Music video
Directed by Gil Green, the music video was premiered on BET's 106 & Park on October 13, 2010. The video, filmed in Miami, Florida, contains Aston Martin models, including the V8 Vantage Volante, DBS V12 Volante, DB9 Volante  and Rapide. Drake and Chrisette Michele are featured in the video as well as a cameo from rapper Birdman. It begins with a young Rick Ross determined to own an Aston Martin and live a luxurious life. Throughout the video, scenes of Ross' lover and her dilemma are played. The plot of the video demonstrates Rick Ross' lover taking the fall for a D.E.A. bust, and finding Rick Ross waiting with an Aston Martin for her to drive when she is released. The lead model who plays the role of Ross' woman is Tracey Thomas.

Interpolation
The song interpolates lyrics from LL Cool J's 1987 single "I Need Love".

Paris Morton Music 

A song by Drake called "Paris Morton Music" features similar music which was also credited to J.U.S.T.I.C.E. League. It differs from "Aston Martin Music" as it does not feature Rick Ross or Chrisette Michele. However, Drake's rather short verse from the original has been extended to a hook (sung by Drake himself), which is played once at the start and once at the end of the song, with Drake's rapping in the middle. Drake's rap verse from Paris Morton Music is featured on Aston Martin Music's single and the music video.

A sequel was featured on Drake's third studio album, Nothing Was the Same as the outro "Pound Cake / Paris Morton Music 2" featuring Jay-Z.

Nine years later, "Paris Morton Music" was included as a track on Drake's 2019 compilation album, Care Package.

Charts

Charts

Weekly charts

Year-end charts

Certifications

References

Rick Ross songs
Drake (musician) songs
Songs written by Drake (musician)
Chrisette Michele songs
2010 singles
Music videos directed by Gil Green
Songs written by Rick Ross
Maybach Music Group singles
Songs written by Chrisette Michele
Songs written by Erik Ortiz
Songs written by Kevin Crowe
2010 songs
Song recordings produced by J.U.S.T.I.C.E. League